Highland High School (HHS) is a public high school located in Gilbert, Arizona, United States. It was built in 1992 and is part of the Gilbert Public Schools district. It accommodates grades 9-12, and in 2010, the school had a student body of 2,957.

In athletics, the school is known collectively as the Highland Hawks. Highland is a member of the Arizona Interscholastic Association's 6A Conference and competes in Division I in all AIA sports.

Campus
Highland High School is located at 4301 E. Guadalupe Road in Gilbert, Arizona, on the south side of Guadalupe between Recker Road and Power Road. Its campus includes a two-story main building, and separate buildings for athletics, administration, and the performing arts. It has a gymnasium, three baseball diamonds, a football field, a marching band practice field, a softball field, and two soccer fields. The school features a student-run convenience store, the Spirit Store, which also sells Highland branded merchandise. An on-campus cafeteria offers school meal options as well as offerings from nationwide vendors. A library serves the student body from 7 am to 4 pm.

Academics
Highland's academic offers are organized under 12 departments: Agriculture, Business, English, Family & Consumer Science, Fine & Performing Arts, Industrial Arts, Math, Modern Language, Physical Education/Education for the body, Science, Social Studies, and Special Education.

Honors courses are offered in English literature, laboratory science, and math, for first- and second-year students. Upperclassmen may then elect to participate in any of 17 Advanced Placement (AP) courses taught at the school. Highland students who maintain at least a 3.8 GPA during the first three grading quarters are recognized as Golden Scholars at a ceremony at the end of each year. Graduation from Highland entails a baccalaureate service and a commencement ceremony.

In 2004, Highland was honored as a Blue Ribbon school.

Student life
Highland hosts more than 70 activities and student clubs. The school has participated in FIRST Robotics Competition either as a stand-alone entity or in partnership with other schools or universities. It won the AZ Regional FRC Competition in 2007, 2008, 2009. It won LA Vegas FRC in 2008.  It won the AZ regional FTC competition in 2011 and 2012. It took first place in 2009 and 2010 at the university level at NURC in cooperation with teammates from Arizona State University. It won the Sparkfun AVC (Autonomous Vehicle Challenge) competition in 2012.

The school's Future Farmers of America (FFA) Chapter won first in state for its ag sales team in 2007.

Other groups at Highland include contingents for Academic Decathlon.

Dances sponsored by the school are Homecoming, Winter Formal, Morp (Valentine's dance; "Prom" spelled backwards, where girls ask guys), and Prom.

Twenty-three percent of HHS students participate in a daily, release-time seminary program operated by the Church of Jesus Christ of Latter-day Saints, which has a religious instruction building adjacent to campus.

Athletics
Highland is known collectively as the Highland Hawks in athletic competition and has won several team and individual state titles.

State championships for the Hawks in sports include the following: 
Boys' basketball: 2023
Girls' basketball: 1994, 1995, 2003, 2005, 2008, 2009
Girls' cross country: 2021
Boys' cross country: 2011, 2019
Boys' croquet: 2003, 2010
Boys' soccer: 2007, 2009
Girls' soccer: 2012, 2015
Boys' volleyball: 2004, 2005, 2013 
Wrestling: 2001, 2005, 2009
Varsity Football: 2021, 2022

Performing arts
Highland's band program has an enrollment of over 300 students in four year-round concert bands, four year-round jazz bands, four spring woodwind choirs, and a competitive marching band. The marching band has received national recognition, and has marched in the Fiesta Bowl Parade (1999), the Disneyland Light Parade (2000), the Tournament of Roses Parade (2001), the Macy's Thanksgiving Day Parade (2004) and the 2021 Pearl Harbor Memorial Parade in Waikiki commemorating the 80th anniversary of the bombings. It ranked #4 in the Fiesta Bowl National Band Championship Competition in 1999 and in 2009. In addition, the Highland Marching Band has been in the top division(s) in the State of Arizona for over 28 consecutive years and consistently qualify for state championships. Furthermore, they are two time state champions with being the first band to ever win the ABODA Division 1 State Marching Band Championship in 2009 and the AzMBA 4A State Championship in 2016.

Uniquely, The Jazz Program hosts a yearly Highland/ASU Jazz Festival for the past 11 years and has the only United Sound Jazz Band Program in the United States. Accolades from the Highland jazz program includes the 2010 and 2017 Judge’s Most Outstanding (Jazz Black), and the 2013, 2015 AMEA State In-Service Performance (Jazz Black).

The Concert Choir traveled to New York City in March 2007 to perform at Carnegie Hall under the direction of then Mormon Tabernacle Choir director Craig Jessop. Previously, it performed at Chicago's Orchestra Hall and at the MENC National Conference in 1998.

Highland's orchestra also performed at Carnegie Hall (2002), and its Symphonic Orchestra performed at the Midwest Clinic in Chicago in 1997, 2007, 2013 and most recently in 2021. HHS is the only school in Arizona to have been selected twice to perform at the Midwest Clinic.

Alumni

 Marquis Cooper '00, former NFL linebacker
 Ryan Fitzpatrick '01, former NFL quarterback
 Spencer Larsen '02, former NFL fullback/linebacker
 Shane Loux '98, former MLB relief pitcher
 Alex Naddour '09, U.S. Olympic medalist in gymnastics
 Matt Pagnozzi '01, former MLB catcher
 James Pazos '09, MLB pitcher
 Brynn Rumfallo, American reality television show cast member and model
 Chaz Schilens '03, former NFL wide receiver

References

External links 
 Official Highland High School website

Education in Gilbert, Arizona
Educational institutions established in 1993
Public high schools in Arizona
Schools in Maricopa County, Arizona
1993 establishments in Arizona